Henry of Bavaria may refer to:

 Henry I, Duke of Bavaria (919/921–955)
 Henry II, Duke of Bavaria (951–995)
 Henry III, Duke of Bavaria (940–989)
 Henry IV, Duke of Bavaria (972–1024), more commonly called Henry II, Holy Roman Emperor
 Henry V, Duke of Bavaria (died 1026)
 Henry VI, Duke of Bavaria (1017–1056), more commonly called Henry III, Holy Roman Emperor
 Henry VII, Duke of Bavaria (died 1047)
 Henry VIII, Duke of Bavaria (1050–1106), more commonly called Henry IV, Holy Roman Emperor
 Henry IX, Duke of Bavaria (1075–1126)
 Henry X, Duke of Bavaria (c. 1108–1139)
 Henry XI, Duke of Bavaria (1107–1177), more commonly called Henry II, Duke of Austria
 Henry XII, Duke of Bavaria (1129–1195), more commonly called Henry the Lion
 Henry XIII, Duke of Bavaria (1235–1290), ruler of Lower Bavaria
 Henry XIV, Duke of Bavaria (1305–1339), ruler of Lower Bavaria 
 Henry XV, Duke of Bavaria (1312–1333), ruler of Lower Bavaria
 Henry XVI, Duke of Bavaria (1386–1450), ruler of Bavaria-Landshut and Bavaria-Ingolstadt
 Henry of the Palatinate (1487–1552)
 Maximilian Henry of Bavaria (1621–1688)
 Louis Henry, Count Palatine of Simmern-Kaiserslautern (1640-1674)
 Otto Henry, Count Palatine of Sulzbach (1556–1604)
 Otto Henry, Elector Palatine (1502–1559)